Sportsperson of the Year was a prize awarded annually to the best athletes of Czechoslovakia from 1959 to 1992 by the Club of Czechoslovak Sports Journalists. The first winner was white-water canoer Vladimír Jirásek. From 1961 the prize was also given to the best sports team; the first team recipient was the Czechoslovakia national ice hockey team. Since the dissolution of Czechoslovakia in 1993, the prize has continued in both successor countries as the Sportsperson of the Year of the Czech Republic and the Sportsperson of the Year of Slovakia.

The individual prize was usually awarded to a single sportsperson, but on two occasions, two people received it – Eva Romanová and Pavel Roman (ice dancers) in 1962, and the Pospíšil brothers (cycle-ball players) in 1979. The prize was given to 28 different athletes, 22 men and 6 women, in 23 sports disciplines. Gymnast Věra Čáslavská won the prize four times, the most of any sportsperson. She was also the only one to have received it in three consecutive years (from 1966 to 1968). Six people were awarded the prize more than once.

The team prize was won by teams in 12 sport disciplines; all winners but one were national teams. The only time members of a sports club team were awarded the Sportsperson of the Year was the Dukla Prague handball team, in 1963. Ice hockey teams were given the award six times – most of all disciplines. Ice hockey goaltender Josef Mikoláš and cross-country skier Květa Jeriová were the only people who won both the individual and the team prize (Mikoláš as a member of the Czechoslovakia national ice hockey team at 1961 World Championships and Jeriová as a member of ski relay at the 1984 Winter Olympics). Men's teams received the prize 20 times, and women's teams won it 3 times. From 1970 to 1977, and in 1979, the team prize was not awarded. The team award was won back to back twice, by the men's national ice hockey team in 1968 and 1969, and by the men's national ski-relay team in 1988 and 1989.

Individual awards

Team awards

See also
 Sportsperson of the Year (Czech Republic)
 Sportsperson of the Year (Slovakia)

References

Czechoslovak sportspeople
Czechoslovakia
Year
Lists of Slovak sportspeople
Awards established in 1959
1959 establishments in Czechoslovakia
1992 disestablishments in Czechoslovakia
Czechoslovak awards

cs:Sportovec roku